Carabus hummeli pusongensis is a subspecies of ground beetle in the subfamily Carabinae that can be found in China, North Korea and Russia.

References

hummeli pusongensis
Beetles described in 1993